First Line is the debut album by tubist Bob Stewart which was recorded in 1988 and released on the JMT label.

Reception
The AllMusic review by Brian Olewnick called it "a bright, juicy set, rambunctious and alive, heavy on the bottom and rolling on top".

Track listing
All compositions by Bob Stewart except as indicated
 "First Line" - 3:38   
 "C.J." - 6:02   
 "Metamorphosis" (Arthur Blythe) - 5:08   
 "Sometimes I Feel Like a Motherless Child/Nonet" (Traditional/Bob Stewart) - 7:42   
 "Hey Mama" (Traditional) - 3:20   
 "Bush Baby" (Blythe) 7:14   
 "Surinam" (Traditional) 4:04   
 "Hambone" - 6:43

Personnel
Bob Stewart - tuba
Stanton Davis - trumpet
Steve Turre - trombone, conch shell
Kelvyn Bell - electric guitar
Idris Muhammad - drums
Arto Tunçboyacıyan - percussion

References 

1988 albums
Bob Stewart (musician) albums
JMT Records albums
Winter & Winter Records albums